The Armenia women's national basketball team represents Armenia in international women's basketball competitions. The women's national team is directed by the Basketball Federation of Armenia.

Competitive record

Women's European Championship for Small Countries

See also

Sport in Armenia

External links
Profile at FIBA website

Women's national basketball teams
Women's national sports teams of Armenia
Armenia national basketball team